Dame Beryl Paston Brown,  (7 March 1909 – 25 July 1997) was a British academic and educator.

Career
Beryl Paston Brown was born in London and educated at Streatham Hill High School and Newnham College, Cambridge. She did a teacher training course in London, however the Great Depression made it very difficult to secure a teaching post. As Principal of Homerton College, Cambridge University, from 1961–71, Dame Beryl was credited with having developed a contemporary, relatively liberal social and academic life for students, as well as a teaching course degree which was validated by London University. A proposal for the establishment of the B.Ed to the Council of the Senate of Cambridge University was first turned down in 1966, for fear of lowering standards, but was eventually approved in the 1970s with the assistance of Newnham College.

Curriculum vitae
 Lecturer, Portsmouth Training College, 1933–37
 Lecturer, Goldsmiths' College, 1937–44, 1946–51
 Temporary Assistant Lecturer, Newnham College, 1944–46
 Principal, City of Leicester Training College, 1952–61
 Principal, Homerton College, 1961–71
 Chair, Association of Teachers in Colleges & Departments of Education, 1965–66

Affiliations
She belonged to the:
 Executive Committee of the Association of Teachers in Colleges and Departments of Education, serving as Chairman from 1965 to 1966 and edited its journal, Education for Teaching.
 Newsom Committee, which produced the report on secondary education, Half Our Future (1963)

Other
Beryl Paston Brown was named DBE in 1967. She retired to Lewes, East Sussex, where she became an Open University tutor and was awarded an Open University honorary degree.

Death
Dame Beryl Paston Brown died in Lewes, East Sussex in 1997, aged 88, from undisclosed causes.

References

External links
 Profile at Informaworld website
  National Portrait Gallery
 Homerton College archived records site

1909 births
1997 deaths
British women academics
Dames Commander of the Order of the British Empire
People from Streatham
Fellows of Homerton College, Cambridge
Alumni of Newnham College, Cambridge
Academics of Goldsmiths, University of London